Reimi Starling Cabrera Rosario (born 31 January 1995) is a Dominican Republic badminton player. He competed at the 2014 and 2018 Central American and Caribbean Games, and clinched the 2018 bronze medal in the men's doubles event partnered with César Brito.

Achievements

Central American and Caribbean Games 
Men's doubles

BWF International Challenge/Series 
Men's doubles

  BWF International Challenge tournament
  BWF International Series tournament
  BWF Future Series tournament

References

External links 
 

1995 births
Living people
Dominican Republic male badminton players
Central American and Caribbean Games bronze medalists for the Dominican Republic
Competitors at the 2014 Central American and Caribbean Games
Competitors at the 2018 Central American and Caribbean Games
Central American and Caribbean Games medalists in badminton
20th-century Dominican Republic people
21st-century Dominican Republic people